Dorin Comaniciu (born 1964) is a Romanian-American computer scientist. He is the Senior Vice President of Artificial Intelligence and Digital Innovation at Siemens Healthcare.

Research 

Comaniciu is known for his work in computer vision, medical imaging and machine learning. His academic publications have 54,000 citations with an H-index of 85. As of 2022, he holds 308 US patents and 550 international patent applications. He joined Siemens in 1999 as a senior research scientist with a focus on computer vision applications for automotive systems. Since 2004, he has served in various research and leadership positions, directing technology development in diagnostic imaging and image-guided surgery

Most recently, his team's research has focused on artificial intelligence, hyper-realistic visualization, and precision medicine.

Together with his team and clinical collaborators, he has helped pioneer many clinical products, including efficient bone reading, vascular analysis, cardiac function assessment, trans-esophageal 3D heart valve assessment, guidance for aortic valve implantation, enhanced stent visualization, compressed sensing for Magnetic Resonance, and automatic patient positioning for Computed Tomography.

Awards and honors

 Institute of Electrical and Electronics Engineers (IEEE) Conference on Computer Vision and Pattern Recognition (CVPR) Best Paper Award 2000 (together with Visvanathan Ramesh and Peter Meer)
IEEE Longuet-Higgins Prize 2010, for 'Fundamental contributions in Computer Vision'
 IEEE Fellow 2012, for contributions to medical image analysis and computer vision
 American Institute for Medical and Biological Engineering (AIMBE) Fellow 2013, for technical contributions to medical imaging using machine learning, and for leadership in imaging technology
 Medical Image Computing and Computer-Assisted Interventions (MICCAI) Society Fellow 2015, for contributions to the theory and practice of medical imaging and image-guided interventions
 Association for Computing Machinery (ACM) Fellow 2017, for contributions to machine intelligence, diagnostic imaging, image-guided interventions, and computer vision
 Honorary doctorate awarded in 2018 from Titu Maiorescu University, Romania
 Member of the National Academy of Medicine 2019

References 

1964 births
Living people
Computer vision researchers
Fellow Members of the IEEE
Wharton School of the University of Pennsylvania alumni
Fellows of the American Institute for Medical and Biological Engineering
Fellows of the Association for Computing Machinery
Members of the National Academy of Medicine